This is a list of UNESCO World Heritage Sites in Central America.

Legend
Site; as per officially inscribed name
Location; at city, regional, or provincial level and geocoordinates
Criteria; as defined by the World Heritage Committee
Area; in hectares and acres. If available, the size of the buffer zone has been noted as well. A value of zero implies that no data has been published by UNESCO
Year; during which the site was inscribed to the World Heritage List
Description; brief information about the site, including reasons for qualifying as an endangered site, if applicable

World Heritage Sites

Location of sites

See also
Lists of World Heritage Sites

Notes

References
General

Notes

External links

UNESCO World Heritage Centre official website
UNESCO World Heritage List official website
VRheritage.org – documentation of World Heritage Sites
Worldheritage-Forum – Information and weblog on World Heritage issues

Americas

Central America-related lists
World Heritage Sites